Loretta Caroline Rose Minghella  (born 4 March 1962) is a British charity executive and solicitor. Since 2021, she has served as Master of Clare College, Cambridge, her alma mater. From November 2017, she served as the First Church Estates Commissioner, one of the most senior lay people in the Church of England. From April 2010 to 2017, she was the Chief Executive Officer of Christian Aid.

Early life and education
Minghella was born on 4 March 1962 on the Isle of Wight, England, to Edoardo Minghella and Gloria Alberta Minghella. She was one of five children, a brother being director Anthony Minghella, whose son Max is an actor. Minghella was educated at Medina High School, a state school in Newport, Isle of Wight. She studied law at Clare College, Cambridge, graduating with a Bachelor of Arts (BA) in 1984. She continued her studies at the College of Law.

Career
From 1985 to 1987, Minghella was an articled clerk at Kingsley Napley. She was admitted as a solicitor in 1987 and continued to work at Kingsley Napley. From 1989 to 1990, she was a legal advisor to the Department of Trade and Industry. 

From 1990 to 1993, having moved into financial regulation, Minghella was an assistant director of the Securities and Investments Board (SIB). From 1993 to 1998, she was head of enforcement law and policy at the SIB. From 1998 to 2004, she was head of enforcement law, policy and international cooperation for the Financial Services Authority (the successor to the SIB). From 2004 to 2010, she served as Chief Executive of the Financial Services Compensation Scheme.

In April 2010, Minghella was appointed Director (later Chief Executive) of Christian Aid. She has also been a trustee of the Disasters Emergency Committee since 2010, and of the St George's House Trust since 2015. As CEO of Christian Aid, she was paid £119,123 in 2011 in the 2011/12 financial year and £126,072 in 2012/2013.

On 28 June 2017, it was announced that Minghella would be the next First Church Estates Commissioner, one of the most senior lay people in the Church of England, in succession to Sir Andreas Whittam Smith. She took up the appointment on 1 November 2017. As the First Church Estates Commissioner, she is a member of the Church Commissioners' Board of Governors, the General Synod of the Church of England, and the Archbishops' Council. Her main duty is serving as chair of the assets committee of the Church Commissioners which is responsible for managing an investment portfolio of £7.9 billion. She will step down in 2021.

In November 2020, it was announced that she would the next Master of Clare College, Cambridge in succession to Tony Grabiner: she took up the appointment in October 2021.

Personal life
In 1992, Minghella married Christopher Parsons. Together they have two children: one son and one daughter.

Minghella is an Anglican Christian. She attends St Barnabas Church, Dulwich, London.

Honours
In the 2010 New Year Honours, Minghella was appointed an Officer of the Order of the British Empire (OBE) "for services to the Financial Services Industry". In October 2016, she was made a Sarum Canon of Salisbury Cathedral, "recognising the contribution she has made to the national and worldwide Church".

References

1962 births
Living people
British solicitors
People from Ryde
Alumni of Clare College, Cambridge
Alumni of The University of Law
Officers of the Order of the British Empire
British Anglicans
Church Estates Commissioners